Iolanda is a given name used in  Italian, Portuguese and Romanian languages. Notable persons with this name include:

 Iolanda Balaș (1936–2016), Romanian Olympic athlete and high jumper 
 Iolanda Batallé (born 1971), Catalan writer 
 Iolanda Cintura (born 1972), Mozambican chemist and politician
 Iolanda Fleming (born 1936), Brazilian professor and politician
 Iolanda García Sàez (born 1975), Spanish ski mountaineer
 Iolanda Gigliotti (1933–1987), known as Dalida, Egypto-Italiano-French vocalist and actress
 Iolanda Nanni (1968–2018), Italian politician
 Iolanda Oanță (born 1965), Romanian athlete

See also
 Asteroid 509 Iolanda
 Jolanda
 Yolanda (disambiguation)

References

Italian feminine given names
Portuguese feminine given names
Romanian feminine given names